Kasegar Mahalleh (also Romanized as Kāsegar Maḩalleh and Kās Gar Maḩalleh) is a village in Pazevar Rural District, Rudbast District, Babolsar County, Mazandaran Province, Iran. At the 2006 census, its population was 1,525, in 408 families.

References 

Populated places in Babolsar County